Dane is an unincorporated community in the Canadian province of Ontario, located within the Unorganized, West Part division of Timiskaming District.

The community is spread along Highway 650 and along Highway 112 at the intersection of these two roads.

Communities in Timiskaming District